Karchag is a rural locality (a selo) and the administrative centre of Karchagsky Selsoviet, Suleyman-Stalsky District, Republic of Dagestan, Russia. The population was 1,739 as of 2010. There are 13 streets.

Geography 
Ekendil is the nearest rural locality.

References 

Rural localities in Suleyman-Stalsky District